Emission computed tomography (ECT) is a type of tomography involving radioactive emissions.

Types include positron emission tomography (PET) and Single-photon emission computed tomography (SPECT).

The imaging agent used in SPECT emits gamma rays, as opposed to the positron emitters (such as 18F) used in PET. There are a range of radiotracers (such as 99mTc, 111In, 123I, 201Tl) that can be used, depending on the specific application.

References

Tomography
3D nuclear medical imaging